Giona Terzo Ortenzi (born 11 May 1996) is an Italian ice dancer. With partner Sara Ghislandi, he has competed at two World Junior Championships, qualifying for the free dance in 2016.

Career 
Ortenzi began learning to skate in 2000. He competed with Francesca Cazzaniga on the advanced novice level in the 2010–11 season. The following season, the duo moved up to the junior level and placed fourth at the Italian Championships. They stopped skating together after that event.

Partnership with Ghislandi 
In 2012, Ortenzi asked Sara Ghislandi if she would skate with him and she accepted. Making their ISU Junior Grand Prix (JGP) debut, they placed 7th in Riga, in August 2013, and 11th in Košice the following month. Ortenzi then missed two months of training due to an ankle injury. Ranked 26th in the short dance, they did not reach the final segment at the 2014 World Junior Championships in Sofia, Bulgaria. The duo was coached by Brunhilde Bianchi and Valter Rizzo in Zanica. After the closure of Zanica's skating rink, the skaters moved to Sesto San Giovanni.

In the 2014–15 season, Ghislandi/Ortenzi listed Barbara Fusar-Poli and Stefano Caruso as their coaches. They placed sixth at their JGP event in Ljubljana and won their first national junior title. They were assigned to the 2015 World Junior Championships in Tallinn, Estonia, but withdrew a couple of weeks before the start of the event.

At the 2016 World Junior Championships in Debrecen, Hungary, Ghislandi/Ortenzi ranked 12th in the first segment and qualified for the free dance, going on to finish tenth overall.

Programs 
(with Ghislandi)

Competitive highlights 
JGP: Junior Grand Prix

With Ghislandi

With Cazzaniga

References

External links 
 
 

1996 births
Italian male ice dancers
Living people
Sportspeople from Como